The Simply Deeper Tour was the debut concert tour by American R&B recording artist Kelly Rowland. It was launched in support of her debut solo album Simply Deep (2002). The Simply Deeper Tour only reached Europe.

History

Touring Europe
This was Rowland's first concert tour as a solo artist and it was used to promote her debut solo studio album, Simply Deep. The concert embarked on a seventeen date tour, hitting up seventeen European cities between September 2003 and October 2003. While Rowland enjoyed moderate success in North American countries such as the U.S. and Canada, her album was a commercial success in the European market and was certified gold or platinum in six countries. Simply Deep also peaked in the top twenty within nine European countries, peaking at number one in both the U.K. and Ireland. Rowland was originally set to embark on her tour at the beginning of April 2003, but pushed the tour back to September 2003 because of fears regarding the ongoing wars with Afghanistan and Iraq.

Critical response
While the tour received limited reviews, the Simply Deeper Tour's London show appeared to be well received. Melisa Tang of the U.K. online entertainment webazine, The Situation, states, "Even though the Hammersmith Apollo was smaller than other venues this girl is probably used to, Kelly had given it her all, and it had certainly paid off. Everyone left the auditorium buzzing with delight, and even I was surprised at how this once shy teenager had blossomed into a strong, confident young woman." Lisa Verrico of The Times had mixed reviews of Rowland’s London show. "There’s no question that Rowland has an outstanding voice and there were a surprising number of good songs in her set." Verrico acknowledges before claiming, "The snag was that they weren’t as good as DC’s best."

Opening acts
 Motley
 Michael Dion
Shawn Emanuel featuring Estelle
 Solange

Set list
 "Simply Deep"
 "Love/Hate"
 "Can't Nobody"
 "Dilemma"
 "(Love Lives In) Strange Places"
 "Everytime You Walk Out That Door"
 "Train on a Track"
 "Destiny's Child Medley:
 "Emotion" (contains excerpts from "How Deep Is Your Love")
 "Bootylicious"
 "Make U Wanna Stay"
 "Beyond Imagination"
 "Stole"
 "Past 12" (Encore)

Tour dates

See also

List of Kelly Rowland live performances

References

Kelly Rowland concert tours
2003 concert tours